The UAE Records in swimming are the fastest times ever swum by a swimmer from the United Arab Emirates. These records are kept by the UAE Swimming Federation.

The federation maintains records for both long course (50m) and short course (25m) competition, for males, in the following events:
freestyle: 50, 100, 200, 400, 800 and 1500;
backstroke: 50, 100 and 200;
breastroke: 50, 100 and 200;
butterfly: 50, 100 and 200;
individual medley (or "IM"): 100 (25m only), 200 and 400;
relays: 4×100 free, 4×200 free, and 4×100 medley

Long course (50m)

Men

|-bgcolor=#DDDDDD
|colspan=9|
|-

|-bgcolor=#DDDDDD
|colspan=9|
|-

|-bgcolor=#DDDDDD
|colspan=9|
|-

|-bgcolor=#DDDDDD
|colspan=9|
|-

|-bgcolor=#DDDDDD
|colspan=9|
|-

Women

Short course (25m)

Men

|-bgcolor=#DDDDDD
|colspan=9|
|-

|-bgcolor=#DDDDDD
|colspan=9|
|-

|-bgcolor=#DDDDDD
|colspan=9|
|-

|-bgcolor=#DDDDDD
|colspan=9|
|-

|-bgcolor=#DDDDDD
|colspan=9|
|-

References

Emirates
Records
Swimming
Swimming